Mohamed Belhadj "Hadj" Mahmoud (born 24 April 2000) is a Tunisian professional footballer who plays as a defensive midfielder for Lugano in the Swiss Super League.

Professional career
Mahmoud joined the youth academy of Étoile du Sahel at the age of 7. He made his professional debut with the clb in a 0–0 Tunisian Ligue Professionnelle 1 tie with Métlaoui on 8 May 2019. On 27 August 2021, he transferred to the Swiss club FC Lugano signing a 4-year contract.

Honours
Lugano
Swiss Cup: 2021–22

References

External links
 
 SFL Profile

2000 births
Living people
Tunisian footballers
Étoile Sportive du Sahel players
FC Lugano players
Tunisian Ligue Professionnelle 1 players
Swiss Super League players
Association football midfielders
Tunisian expatriate footballers
Tunisian expatriate sportspeople in Switzerland
Expatriate footballers in Switzerland